The 1867 Parnell by-election was a by-election held on 5 June 1867 during the 4th New Zealand Parliament in the Auckland electorate of .

The by-election was caused by the resignation of the incumbent MP Frederick Whitaker.

The by-election was won by Charles Heaphy. Major Heaphy (VC) was unopposed, and hence was then declared elected.

Notes

Parnell 1867
1867 elections in New Zealand
Politics of the Auckland Region
June 1867 events